The Phase 3 Eclipse is an American ultralight aircraft that was designed by Bruce Emmons and produced by Phase 3 Aircraft. The aircraft was supplied as a kit for amateur construction.

Design and development
It features a cantilever high-wing, inverted V-tail, a single-seat, open cockpit, tricycle landing gear and a single engine in pusher configuration.

The aircraft is made from bolted-together aluminum tubing, with the flying surfaces covered in double surface Dacron sailcloth. Its elliptical planform  span wing it mounted using several cabane struts and produces a 15:1 glide ratio. The pilot sits on an open-air seat, without a windshield. The control system is unusual in that roll control is by cable-actuated wing warping. All three landing gear wheels have suspension and the nosewheel is steerable. The  KFM 107 powerplant is mounted behind the pilot's seat, with the propeller in between the upper and lower tailboom tubes. The design was proof-tested to +9/-9 g. The aircraft exhibits good stability in all axes in flight and can be quickly dismantled for storage or ground transport. The wing is removed with three bolts.

The design was introduced just before the ultralight market in the US became saturated in 1984, as such it such never became a commercial success. Only a small number were completed.

Specifications (Eclipse)

References

1980s United States ultralight aircraft
Homebuilt aircraft
Single-engined pusher aircraft
High-wing aircraft
V-tail aircraft